The 1991 Trans America Athletic Conference men's basketball tournament (now known as the ASUN men's basketball tournament) was held March 5–7 at the Edmunds Center in DeLand, Florida.

Georgia State defeated  in the championship game, 80–60, to win their first TAAC/Atlantic Sun men's basketball tournament. 

The Panthers, therefore, received the TAAC's automatic bid to the 1991 NCAA tournament, their first Division I tournament appearance. 

Hardin–Simmons departed the TAAC for Division III prior to the season, leaving the conference membership at eight. As such, the TAAC tournament returned to its old format where all of the league's members participated.

Bracket

References

ASUN men's basketball tournament
Tournament
TAAC men's basketball tournament
TAAC men's basketball tournament